Ubayd Allah ibn Abi Bakra (عبيد الله بن أبي بكرة, died  CE) was an Umayyad governor of Sijistan and a military commander.

Origins
He was the son of Abu Bakra, an Abyssinian slave and mawla (client or freedman) who had been a companion of the Islamic prophet Muhammad and converted to Islam in 630. Ubayd Allah's mother was an Arab. He was physically described as having "a dark and swarthy complexion".

Governorship and military activities
He was appointed the deputy governor of Sistan in 671 by the governor of Iraq and the eastern Caliphate, Ziyad ibn Abihi. During the early reign of Caliph Abd al-Malik Ubayd Allah supported the pro-Umayyad faction in Basra, one of the two principal garrison towns of Iraq, against its ruler at the time Mus'ab ibn al-Zubayr, the representative of his brother, the rival caliph Abd Allah ibn al-Zubayr. He was reappointed over Sijistan a second time in 697/698 by Abd al-Malik's governor of Iraq and the east, al-Hajjaj ibn Yusuf.

In 698, he was dispatched by al-Hajjaj to lead a 20,000-strong 'Army of Destruction' against the Zunbils in modern-day Afghanistan. This corresponded to a resurgence of Islamic expansionism, following the second civil war (683–692). His mission was to raid eastern Afghanistan, and restore the payment of tribute by the Zunbils.

Trapped in the mountains, he was defeated through starvation and Zunbil attacks, and was forced to offer a large tribute, give hostages, including three of his sons, and take an oath not to invade Zunbil again. He then retreated, with 5,000 of his men remaining, to the city of Bust.

Ubayd Allah died soon after the abortive campaign. He was succeeded as governor of Sijistan by his son Abu Bardha, who held the post for one or two years and is known to have minted coinage as well.

Around 700, al-Hajjaj appointed an Arab noble from Kufa, Ibn al-Ash'ath, was tasked by al-Hajjaj with a renewed offensive against the Zunbils. After some initial successes, he reached an agreement with the Zunbils, who agreed to return the hostages captured from Ubayd Allah and resume paying the tribute at the original rate. Afterward, he took his army back to Iraq and led a revolt against al-Hajjaj.

Coinage
Before Ubayd Allah, Arab coinage from Sijistan was remarkably consistent in respecting former Sasanian designs. In contrast, the coinage of Ubayd Allah is characterized by a relatively erratic design, with marked iconographical changes. This attests to the deterioration of standard Sasanian iconography.

References

7th-century Arabs
7th-century military personnel
Generals of the Umayyad Caliphate
Umayyad governors of Sijistan

ar:عبيد الله بن أبي بكرة